The Mississippi County Courthouse is a courthouse at Poplar Street and Hale Avenue in Osceola, Arkansas, United States, one of two county seats of Mississippi County, built in 1912. It was listed on the National Register of Historic Places in 1978. The courthouse was built in the Classic Revival style by John Gainsford and anchors the Osceola town square.

Architecture
The entire first floor of the courthouse is windowless because it originally housed the county jail. Large outdoor stairs ascend to a second story entrance. Baked stone tiles make up the floors, with various colors being used throughout the building. The exterior of the courthouse consists of long, slender bricks. A copper dome is encircled by several terra cotta decorations. In 2020, a team of copper roofing specialists with Renaissance Roofing worked to restore the dome to its former glory.

See also
 Mississippi County Courthouse, Chickasawba District, Mississippi County's other courthouse in Blytheville
 National Register of Historic Places listings in Mississippi County, Arkansas

References

Neoclassical architecture in Arkansas
Government buildings completed in 1912
Courthouses on the National Register of Historic Places in Arkansas
County courthouses in Arkansas
Osceola, Arkansas
1912 establishments in Arkansas
National Register of Historic Places in Mississippi County, Arkansas
Individually listed contributing properties to historic districts on the National Register in Arkansas